Sousa is a crater on Mercury.  Its name was adopted by the International Astronomical Union (IAU) on April 24, 2012. Sousa is named for American bandmaster and composer John Philip Sousa.

Sousa is one of the better preserved of 110 peak ring basins on Mercury.

References